Richard John Puddephatt,  was born 1943 in Aylesbury, England. He is a distinguished university professor in the department of chemistry at the University of Western Ontario, in London, Ontario, Canada. Richard is a former holder of a Canada research chair in material synthesis. He has been studying the fundamental chemistry of gold and other precious metals in the development of new materials for potential applications in health care and electronics. Puddephatt's research interests involve organometallic chemistry related to catalysis and materials science, and he is considered a world expert on platinum and gold chemistry. He has authored two books: The Chemistry of Gold and The Periodic Table of Elements.

Education 
 Penn and Tylers Green Primary School
 High Wycombe Royal Grammar School
 BSc from the University of London in 1965
 PhD from University College London in 1968

Research and career
Puddephatt has conducted pioneering research on synthesis, reactivity and elucidation of mechanisms in the organometallic chemistry of the noble metals, particularly related to the role of organometallic compounds in catalysis and in materials science. He has elucidated the mechanisms of reactions which are fundamental in many homogenous catalytic processes, most notably in studies of oxidative addition and reductive elimination with alkylplatinum and alkyl–gold complexes and of skeletal rearrangements of metallacyclobutane complexes, often called the Puddephatt rearrangement.

Remarkable coordinatively unsaturated platinum clusters and platinum–rhenium clusters have been synthesised and shown to be excellent mimics of the surface reactivity, related to heterogeneous catalysis by supported platinum and bimetallic platinum–rhenium catalysts. New, commercially useful organometallic precursors for chemical vapour deposition (CVD) of thin films of metals such as palladium, platinum, silver and gold have been discovered and the fundamental mechanisms of those CVD processes elucidated. He has also synthesised catenanes and metal-containing polymers by dynamic ring opening polymerisation.

Awards and honours 
Puddephatt was won numerous awards including

 Officer of the Order of Canada
 Distinguished University Professor
 Elected a Fellow of the Royal Society, FRS in 1998
 Fellow of the Royal Society of Canada, FRSC
 Canada Research Chair
 Bucke Science Prize and Hellmuth Prize, University of Western Ontario
 Alcan Award and E.W.R. Steacie Award of the Chemical Society of Canada
 CIC Medal of the Chemical Institute of Canada
 Nyholm Lecture Award and Award for Chemistry of the Noble Metals of the Royal Society of Chemistry
 E.G. Pleva Teaching Award
 NSERC Award of Excellence (2001)

References

1943 births
Living people
People from Aylesbury
People from London, Ontario
People educated at the Royal Grammar School, High Wycombe
Alumni of the University of London
Alumni of University College London
Officers of the Order of Canada
Canada Research Chairs
Academic staff of the University of Western Ontario
Fellows of the Royal Society of Canada
Fellows of the Royal Society